The Virginia Capitol Cavaliers was an American soccer club based in the Northern Virginia suburbs of Washington, D.C. The team was a member of the American Soccer League.

After their first season, the club became the Washington Cavaliers.

Year-by-year

References

C
Defunct soccer clubs in Virginia
American Soccer League (1933–1983) teams
1971 establishments in Virginia
1972 disestablishments in Virginia
Association football clubs disestablished in 1972
Association football clubs established in 1971
Defunct sports teams in Washington, D.C.